Lyon won Division 1 season 2001/2002 of the French Association Football League with 66 points. The title was decided in the very final game of the season when Lyon defeated erstwhile championship leaders Lens at Stade Gerland. Lyon had to win the match to take the title, and won 3–1, ending Lens's title dream. It was Lyon's first league championship, and it began their record seven successive league titles.

Participating teams

 Auxerre
 Bastia
 Bordeaux
 Guingamp
 Lens
 Lille
 Lorient
 Lyon
 Marseille
 Metz
 Monaco
 Montpellier
 Nantes
 Paris Saint-Germain
 Rennes
 Sedan
 Sochaux
 Troyes

League table

Promoted from Ligue 2, who will play in Ligue 1 season 2002/2003
 AC Ajaccio : champion of Ligue 2
 RC Strasbourg : runners-up
 OGC Nice : third place
 Le Havre AC : fourth place

Results

Top goalscorers

References

External links
France 2001/02 at Rec.Sport.Soccer Statistics Foundation

Ligue 1 seasons
France
1